Od zlata jabuka (trans. Golden Apple) is the sixth studio album from Serbian and former Yugoslav rock band YU Grupa. Od zlata jabuka, released in 1987, is the band's first album since they reunited the same year.

The album cover features a detail from Albrecht Dürer's painting Adam and Eve.

Track listing
"Od zlata jabuka" (Kostić, Raičević, Telalović) – 3:31
"Pogled sa šanka" (Jelić, Čuturilo) – 2:07
"Zvuk na vratima" (Jelić, Čuturilo) – 3:32
"Neko mi treba" (Jelić, Čuturilo) – 2:24
"Magla" (Jelić, Telalović) - 2:57
"Ulica kestena" (Jelić, Kostić, Čuturilo) – 4:19
"Kalibar 86" (Jelić, Telalović) – 3:15
"Ti si otrov moj" (Jelić, Kostić, Čuturilo) – 3:28
"Slomljeni od istine" (Jelić, Čuturilo) – 3:05

Personnel
Dragi Jelić - guitar, vocals
Žika Jelić - bass guitar
Bata Kostić - guitar
Velibor Bogdanović - drums

Guest musicians
Saša Lokner - keyboards
Nikola Čuturilo - backing vocals
Vladimir Golubović - drums (on "Magle")

References 
 EX YU ROCK enciklopedija 1960-2006,  Janjatović Petar;  

YU Grupa albums
1987 albums
ZKP RTLJ albums